Graells's tamarin, Leontocebus nigricollis graellsi, is a subspecies of the black-mantled tamarin from the northwestern Amazon in southeastern Colombia, eastern Ecuador and northeastern Peru. It differs from other black-mantled tamarins in having a dull olive-brown (no reddish-orange) lower back, rump and thighs.  However, molecular genetic analysis does not support treating Graell's tamarin as a separate species from the black-mantled tamarin.

References

Further reading 

Graells's tamarin
Mammals of Colombia
Mammals of Ecuador
Mammals of Peru
Graells's tamarin

Subspecies
Taxa named by Marcos Jiménez de la Espada